Audrey is an Anglo-Norman given name from Æðelþryð.

Audrey may also refer to:
 Audrey (owarai), owarai or comedy duo in Japan
 Hurricane Audrey, a 1957 hurricane that devastated Louisiana
 The 3Com Audrey, a short-lived Internet appliance
 Audrey, a U.S. magazine for Asian American women
 Audrey (band), a Swedish music group
 Audrey, a painting by Philip Richard Morris
 Audrey (novel), a best-selling 1902 novel by Mary Johnston
 Audrey (1916 film), an American silent drama film
 Audrey (2014 film), an American comedy film
 Audrey (2020 film), a British documentary film about Audrey Hepburn
 Audrey (tugboat), a 1909 small steam vessel 
 Audrey Smith, a character in the animated series Harvey Street Kids